Super Mario 3D All-Stars is a 2020 compilation of platform games for the Nintendo Switch. It commemorates the 35th anniversary of Nintendo's Super Mario franchise, with high-definition ports of Super Mario 64 (1996), Super Mario Sunshine (2002), and Super Mario Galaxy (2007).

The compilation was released on September 18, 2020 and was available until March 31, 2021, when it was discontinued and removed from the Nintendo eShop. It received positive reviews for its games, technical improvements, and controls, but it was criticized for its presentation, lack of additional content, time-limited release, and the absence of Super Mario Galaxy 2 (2010). As of March 2021, Super Mario 3D All-Stars had sold more than 9 million copies worldwide, making it one of the best selling video games of 2020.

Content 

Super Mario 3D All-Stars compiles high-definition ports of the first three 3D platform games in the Super Mario series: Super Mario 64 (1996), Super Mario Sunshine (2002), and Super Mario Galaxy (2007). The version of Super Mario 64 is the Shindō version released only in Japan in July 1997, which added bug fixes and gameplay alterations. Rumble support was also based from this version as well.

The games in the collection utilize emulation. They support Joy-Con controls with rumble function, and are displayed at higher resolutions, such as Sunshine running in a 16:9 aspect ratio. Both Sunshine and Galaxy are displayed in 1080p in TV Mode and 720p in Handheld Mode, while 64 is displayed in 720p in both modes in a 4:3 aspect ratio. A patch released in November 2020 added camera options for all three games and control options for F.L.U.D.D. in Sunshine.

Sunshine did not initially natively support the GameCube controller on the Nintendo Switch. When originally released on the GameCube, Sunshine used the GameCube controller's analog triggers (which Switch controllers do not have) to regulate F.L.U.D.D.'s water pressure. For the collection, F.L.U.D.D. is controlled with the right bumper for precision aiming while standing still, while using the right trigger "is akin to pulling the GameCube's analog trigger to about the three-quarters mark". GameCube controller support for Sunshine was added in November 2020. A further patch released in November 2021 enabled Super Mario 64 to be played with the Nintendo 64 wireless controller available to Nintendo Switch Online subscribers.

Galaxy features optional Joy-Con controls that imitate the motion-controlled setup of the Wii Remote and Nunchuk, with Mario's spin ability remapped to the Y button. In handheld mode, players can use the touchscreen in lieu of the pointer. To play Galaxy cooperative gameplay mode in handheld mode, a secondary Joy-Con is needed.

The compilation also features a music player mode, which compiles the entire original soundtracks of all three games—a total of 175 tracks. The music can be played when the screen is turned off.

Development and release 
Super Mario 3D All-Stars was developed and published by Nintendo to commemorate the 35th anniversary of the original Super Mario Bros. (1985). According to Eurogamer, Nintendo referred to the compilation as Super Mario All-Stars 2 internally. Nintendo's goal was to retain the included games' "original design and spirit" with updates to the resolutions and controls. According to Kenta Motokura, the project's producer, the developers interviewed the games' original staff to learn of each's importance.  The Super Mario Sunshine port in the collection uses GameCube emulation technology developed by Nintendo European Research & Development (NERD), who further collaborated with the 3D All-Stars development team on several new features for the game and upgraded its full motion videos to HD using their own deep learning engine. NERD also assisted with the Super Mario Galaxy port by providing graphics and audio emulation technologies.

The collection was first reported by Video Games Chronicle in March 2020, and corroborated by other outlets. According to these reports, Nintendo planned to announce it during a Mario-themed presentation at E3 2020, but this was cancelled due to the COVID-19 pandemic. Nintendo would announce the collection in a special Nintendo Direct for the 35th anniversary on September 3, 2020, along with a release date of September 18, 2020. It was available to purchase for a limited time, both physically and digitally until March 31, 2021. Doug Bowser, the president of Nintendo of America, said that the game's limited availability was due to it being part of the celebration of the 35th anniversary, an approach the company does not plan on using widely for other releases.

Reception

Critical response 

According to the review aggregating website Metacritic, Super Mario 3D All-Stars received "generally favorable reviews". Critics generally agreed that the games themselves remained enjoyable, but were divided over the presentation, which received criticism for its simplistic nature and lack of additional features, its limited time release, and the absence of Super Mario Galaxy 2 (2010).

Ian Walker from Kotaku said the port of 64 "hasn't introduced any obviously unfortunate consequences" and even fixed some "occasional performance dips" from the original, and that the controls for the game worked well on the Switch. For Sunshine, he felt the adjusted controls would affect anyone playing who had muscle memory from the original and that the visuals stuttered somewhat late in the game. For Galaxy, Walker was thankful some of the motion-based controls were remapped to controller buttons but added some of the areas that still required the motion controls were still problematic as they were on the Wii.

IGNs Zachary Ryan was "a little bit disappointed in the lack of effort Nintendo has put into" the collection, when compared to the "major overhauls" done for the games in Super Mario All-Stars, and noted the use of emulation to present the three games helped explain "a lot about the lack of upgrades" in each. For 64, Ryan felt the upscaling made the game look the nicest it ever had, and called the controls "still super tight" and "right at home on a Pro Controller or Joy-Con", despite the x-axis camera controls being inverted (a later patch would make this optional). He did wish Nintendo had added "some quality-of-life upgrades", feeling players experiencing the game for the first time "might find it somewhat inaccessible". Sunshine was still a fantastic looking game and commended the controls still remaining fluid, though Ryan experienced some slowdown in certain moments. Finally, Ryan felt upscaling Galaxy made it "a fully realized version" of the game and praised the updated control options, adding the handheld mode configuration, while "not the most ideal way to play", still worked.

Sales 
By September 7, pre-orders for Super Mario 3D All-Stars had made it the second-bestselling game of 2020 on Amazon in the United States, behind Animal Crossing: New Horizons. Base.com, an online retailer in the United Kingdom, was forced to cancel all of their customer's pre-orders because their allocation of physical games was not enough to fulfil pre-orders. They added that Nintendo and their UK distributors were "unable to give... any reassurance" that more copies would be made available to them through the on-sale period.

In its first week of release, Super Mario 3D All-Stars was the best-selling game in the UK, and was the third-largest game launch of 2020 and the fifth-fastest selling Switch game in the country. In Japan, the game sold over 210,000 physical copies within the first three days of its release. In the United States, Super Mario 3D All-Stars was the second-best selling game of September behind Marvel's Avengers, and had become the 10th best-selling game of 2020. The collection was also the best-selling game in September for Europe, the Middle East, Africa, and Asia. , Super Mario 3D All-Stars has sold over 9.01 million units worldwide. In March 2021, ahead of its delisting, the game's physical sales in the United Kingdom spiked around 267%.

Notes

References

External links 

2020 video games
Products and services discontinued in 2021
3D platform games
Multiplayer and single-player video games
Nintendo Switch games
Nintendo Switch-only games
Nintendo video game compilations
3D All-Stars
Video game remasters
Video games developed in Japan
Super Mario Bros. 35th Anniversary